Madeleina Kay is a British writer, illustrator, and political activist from Sheffield, England. She was Young European of the Year 2018. Using the hashtag #EUsupergirl, she campaigned to promote the European Union and for the United Kingdom to remain a member.

She has been interviewed on the BBC television show Daily Politics, BBC Sunday Politics, BBC Radio 4, Reuters and Euronews. She has also appeared on panel debates for Channel 4 News, and the BBC Radio 4 political talk show Any Questions. Photos and articles about her campaign have been published in the Evening Standard, The Guardian, the Daily Telegraph, Paris Match,
French Grazia, and La Croix.

Kay has written and illustrated a number of children's books, including Go back to where you came from! (2016), Alba White Wolf's adventures in Europe (2017), Theresa Maybe in Brexitland (2017), and Thump the orange gorilla at the big world zoo (2018).

Kay was the Young Talent Winner of the Great British Postcard Competition 2017. She came third place in the Europe in my Region blogging competition 2017. In 2018, Kay was awarded with the Young European of the Year title by the European Parliament and the Schwarzkopf Foundation, honouring her for her "pro-European efforts in the UK & beyond".

References 

Living people
21st-century British women writers
Brexit
British bloggers
Political activists
British women bloggers
1994 births